Psycho-Pass Providence  is a 2023 anime science fiction crime film produced by Production I.G and directed by Naoyoshi Shiotani.

Cast

Production
The film was first revealed in August 2022 as part of a celebration of the Psycho-Pass anime series reaching its 10th anniversary with Naoyoshi Shiotani returning to direct at Production I.G, and TOHO is distributing. The 10th anniversary was promoted by Tomokazu Seki, voice of one of the leads, Shinya Kogami. The radio program was also used again with Kenji Nojima, voice of Nobuchika Ginoza, serving as host. Multiple other promotional events were made across 2022. 

In January 2023, it was announced the film would premiere on May 12, 2023 featuring the return of writers Makoto Fukami and Tow Ubukata. The theme song "Alexithymia Spare" by Ling tosite Sigure, while the ending theme song "Tōjisha" (The One Concerned) by EGOIST.

References

External links
  
 

2023 anime films
2023 films
2020s dystopian films
Psycho-Pass
Cyberpunk films
Films set in the future
Films set in the 2100s
Production I.G
Science fiction anime and manga
Toho animated films